Live (also titled as Straight Up Funk Go Go Style) is a live album recorded and released in 1981 by the Washington, D.C.-based go-go band Trouble Funk. This was the group's debut album, and consist of four approximately 15-minute jam sessions.  The album was remastered and reissued in 1996.

Track listing

"Part A" – 14:02
"Part B" – 13:42
"Part C" – 14:56
"Part D" – 15:14

Personnel
 Chester "T-Bone" Davis – electric guitar
 Tony Fisher – lead vocals, bass guitar
 Emmett Nixon – drums
 James Avery – keyboards
 Robert Reed – keyboards
 Mack Carey – percussions, congas
 Timothy David – percussions, congas
 David Rudd – saxophone
 Gerald Reed – trombone
 Taylor Reed – trombone, trumpet

References

External links
 
 Live at Discogs.com

1981 debut albums
1981 live albums
Trouble Funk albums